Mama Makes Up Her Mind: And Other Dangers of Southern Living is a 1993 autobiography by Bailey White. The book is a collection of humorous anecdotes about White's experiences as a first-grade teacher living with her mother in rural Georgia. White originally presented these anecdotes as a series of fifty short pieces for National Public Radio, reading them herself. The book was also serialised in the Boston Globe and the Miami Herald.

Critical reception
Publishers Weekly said readers and radio listeners would enjoy Mama Makes Up Her Mind while Smithsonian said White's book would create her footing alongside other authors of Southern United States.

References

1993 non-fiction books
American autobiographies